María Regla Prío Socarrás  (October 11, 1909 in Cuba – December 2005 in Miami, Florida USA) was a member of the Cuban House of Representatives (1948–1952) and the sister of Cuban President, Carlos Prío Socarrás.

She was married to Dr. Enrique C. Henriquez Lauranzon.  She is buried in Woodlawn Park Cemetery and Mausoleum (now Caballero Rivero Woodlawn North Park Cemetery and Mausoleum) in Miami, Florida.

References

 Libro de Oro de la Sociedad Habanera 1949, (Editorial Lex) 
 Libro de Oro de la Sociedad Habanera 1950, (Editorial Lex) 

1909 births
2005 deaths
Members of the Cuban House of Representatives
20th-century Cuban women politicians
20th-century Cuban politicians
Cuban emigrants to the United States